The Prosecution of Offences Act 1908 was an act of the United Kingdom Parliament passed in 1908.

Its Section 1 repealed Section 2 of the 1884 act of the same name, thus splitting the offices of Director of Public Prosecutions and Treasury Solicitor. That Section of the 1908 Act also removed the upper bar on his salary enacted in the 1879 act of the same name and reiterated the minimum experience of ten years for Directors and seven years for his assistants from the 1879 act. The 1908 Act's Section 2 made other minor amendments to the 1879 Act as well as substituting the Director for the Solicitor in the section of the Coinage (Offences) Act 1861 relating to the costs of prosecutions.

References

United Kingdom Acts of Parliament 1908
Prosecution services of the United Kingdom